Senator Wolcott may refer to:

Edward O. Wolcott (1848–1905),  U.S. Senator from Colorado from 1889 to 1901
John J. Wolcott (1810–1881), New York State Senate from 1866 to 1867
Josiah O. Wolcott (1877–1938), U.S. Senator from Delaware from 1917 to 1921